Series 15 of Top Gear, a British motoring magazine and factual television programme, was broadcast in the United Kingdom on BBC Two and BBC HD during 2010, consisting of six episodes that were aired between 27 June and 1 August; the new series was promoted with a special trailer that made use of a clip published on YouTube. This series saw the replacement of the Chevrolet Lacetti by the Kia Cee'd as the Reasonably Priced Car.

This series' highlights included the creation of home-made motorhomes, the driving of a modified Toyota Hilux up to the active Eyjafjallajökull volcano during one of its eruptions, the testing of budget cars to see if they are suitable for track days, and the production of a tribute to the late Ayrton Senna. Two compilation episodes featuring the best moments from the fifteenth series, titled "Best of Top Gear", were aired on 8 and 15 August 2010.

Episodes

Best-of episodes

Criticism and Controversy
The fifteenth series faced criticism after the broadcast of the fifth episode, when Clarkson joked during a "News" segment that he had been in cab the other day and truly seen a woman wearing a burka tripping up on a pavement, upon which he could see that under it she was wearing a "red g-string and stockings".  Following the broadcast of the episode, the BBC received a number of complaints regarding the joke, with the singer Lily Allen writing on Twitter that the joke was "distasteful", while a Mediawatch spokesperson said that Clarkson "should learn to keep quiet".

However, in an article written for The Week, Antonia Bland defended the presenter's joke, saying that Clarkson had done nothing wrong and that Muslim women who wore a burka had the right to "choose to wear gorgeous lingerie in private", adding that the joke proved a good example of the dangers faced by male drivers trying to concentrate on the road during Summer.

Notes
The viewing figures shown in the Episode Table above (with the exception of the first episode), are a combination of the figures from the BBC Two broadcast and the BBC HD broadcast.

References

External links
 Top Gear caught in action. Embarrassing parents. – Original YouTube video used by the BBC to advertise Season 15.

2010 British television seasons
Top Gear seasons